Duarte Filipe Baptista de Matos Marques (born 9 May 1981, in Mação) is a Portuguese consultant and politician, who is a member of the Assembly of the Republic, having been elected since 2011 from the Santarém constituency. He is a former president of the Social Democratic Youth, holding office from 2010 to 2012.

References

External links

 Twitter profile

1981 births
Living people
People from Mação
Consultants
21st-century Portuguese politicians
Members of the Assembly of the Republic (Portugal)